The 2019 UAE Super Cup was the 12th professional and 19th overall UAE Super Cup, an annual football match played between the winners of the previous season's Pro-League and President's Cup.

It was contested at the Al Maktoum Stadium, between Sharjah and Shabab Al Ahli, winners of 2018–19 Pro-League and 2018–19 President's Cup, respectively.

Details

See also
2018–19 UAE Pro-League
2018–19 UAE President's Cup

References

External links

UAE Super Cup
Shabab Al-Ahli Dubai FC
UAE Super Cup seasons